Divine Carcasse (Divine Body) is a 1998 Beninese ethnofiction film directed by the Belgian filmmaker Dominique Loreau.

Mixing fiction and ethnography, the film follows a 1955 Peugeot: initially owned by Simon, an expatriate European philosophy lecturer, the car comes to be owned by Joseph, who uses it as a taxi until it is abandoned at a mechanic's workshop. There it is scavenged for parts used by the artist Simonet Biokou to create a sculpture of the ram god Agbo. The car is caught between commodity fetishism and post-colonial fetish spirituality:

References

External links
 
 Divine Caracsse, California Newsreel. 

1998 films
Beninese drama films